Are You the One? Season of Fate is the seventh season of MTV's reality dating series Are You the One?. It was filmed in Kona, Hawaii, at the Hokukano Bayhouse and premiered on August 15, 2018. This season featured a change in the rules to get a date, the contestants no longer had to compete against each other to win a date. Instead Terrance would choose two people, one guy and one girl, to come up and press a button stopping a scrolling wheel of faces at random of the opposite sex. Two guys and two girls would be chosen at random to go on a four-person date to couple off as they choose. Everyone back at the house then voted whichever couple they thought most likely to be a 'Perfect Match' into the Truth Booth.

Cast

Progress 

Notes

 = Unconfirmed perfect match

Truth Booths

Episodes

{{Episode table |background=#FBCD26 |overall=5 |season=5 |title=30 |airdate=20 |country= U.S. |viewers=10 |episodes=
{{Episode List
 |EpisodeNumber   = 63
 |EpisodeNumber2  = 1
 |Title           = Leap of Fate
 |OriginalAirDate = 
 |ShortSummary    = 22 singles arrive in Hawaii searching for their perfect match. |Viewers         = 0.48
 |LineColor       = FBCD26
}}
{{Episode List
 |EpisodeNumber   = 64
 |EpisodeNumber2  = 2
 |Title           = Flirt at Your Own Risk
 |OriginalAirDate = 
 |ShortSummary    = The whole house gets involved when Bria reacts to Zak's flirtatious ways, and Tevin and Kenya's pasts threatens their future together. |Viewers         = 0.449
 |LineColor       = FBCD26
}}
{{Episode List
 |EpisodeNumber   = 65
 |EpisodeNumber2  = 3
 |Title           = With Frenemies Like These...
 |OriginalAirDate = 
 |ShortSummary    = Zak explores his options while the women fight each other for his attention. Kenya and Jasmine officially become enemies. |Viewers         = 0.54
 |LineColor       = FBCD26
}}
{{Episode List
 |EpisodeNumber   = 66
 |EpisodeNumber2  = 4
 |Title           = A Boyfriend by Any Other Name
 |OriginalAirDate = 
 |ShortSummary    = Asia is hurt when she learns what her friend and her crush did behind her back. Cali and Brett's budding romance is jeopardized by their own bad dating habits.
Perfect Match #1:  Shamoy & Maria |Viewers         = 0.48
 |LineColor       = FBCD26
}}
{{Episode List
 |EpisodeNumber   = 67
 |EpisodeNumber2  = 5
 |Title           = Ex-tracurricular Activities
 |OriginalAirDate = 
 |ShortSummary    = The house is shook when their exes show up to spend some quality time. Tension soars when one ex threatens to break up a power couple and another gets aggressive. Zak is torn between Bria and Morgan. |Viewers         = 0.45
 |LineColor       = FBCD26
}}
{{Episode List
 |EpisodeNumber   = 68
 |EpisodeNumber2  = 6
 |Title           = Spilling the Tea
 |OriginalAirDate = 
 |ShortSummary    = Kwasi starts drama when he lets slip what Tevin and Jasmine did the night before. Bria is angered by Morgan and Zak's developing relationship. The house makes some risky choices in picking their matches. |Viewers         = 0.47
 |LineColor       = FBCD26
}}
{{Episode List
 |EpisodeNumber   = 69
 |EpisodeNumber2  = 7
 |Title           = He Loves Me Not
 |OriginalAirDate = 
 |ShortSummary    = Cam starts to question his relationship with Kayla. Daniel's fun and games pushes Sam away. The house faces their most important Truth Booth yet. |Viewers         = 0.42
 |LineColor       = FBCD26
}}
{{Episode List
 |EpisodeNumber   = 70
 |EpisodeNumber2  = 8
 |Title           = Beast Mode
 |OriginalAirDate = 
 |ShortSummary    = Tensions erupt between Cam and Kwasi when Kwasi makes moves on Kayla. Asia explodes when she thinks certain people in the house are being shady. Zak has a choice to make. |Viewers         = 0.36
 |LineColor       = FBCD26
}}
{{Episode List
 |EpisodeNumber   = 71
 |EpisodeNumber2  = 9
 |Title           = I Want You to Want Me
 |OriginalAirDate = 
 |ShortSummary    = Nutsa crushes on Brett while Brett's inability to get over Cali has consequences for the entire house. Moe is pushed to start playing the game. Lewis reveals his true feelings to Asia. |Viewers         = 0.46
 |LineColor       = FBCD26
}}
{{Episode List
 |EpisodeNumber   = 72
 |EpisodeNumber2  = 10
 |Title           = Master Plan
 |OriginalAirDate = 
 |ShortSummary    = Bria's obsession with Zak and Zak's player ways threaten the house's ability to play the game. Cali comes up with a plan to find out which of the power couples are a Perfect Match and which are not. |Viewers         = 0.43
 |LineColor       = FBCD26
}}
{{Episode List
 |EpisodeNumber   = 73
 |EpisodeNumber2  = 11
 |Title           = Once Upon a Crazy Party Time
 |OriginalAirDate = 
 |ShortSummary    = At a wild party, questionable behavior turns best friends into best enemies. Tevin and Kenya get ready to learn their fate. Moe is pushed to step up his game. |Viewers         = 0.422
 |LineColor       = FBCD26
}}

}}

After filming 
Tevin Grant and Kenya Scott appeared on the third season of the MTV dating show Ex on the Beach.

Maria Elizondo appeared on Double Shot at Love with DJ Pauly D and Vinny.

Cali Trepp and Tomas Buenos got engaged in November of 2021.

References

Are You the One?
2018 American television seasons